A chain of command is the hierarchical line of authority and responsibility in which one rank obeys the one above it, usually used in the military

Chain of command may also refer to:

 Chain of Command (1994 film), a 1994 action TV film starring Michael Dudikoff
 Chain of Command (2000 film), a 2000 political thriller TV film starring Roy Scheider and Patrick Muldoon
 Chain of Command (2015 film), a 2015 film starring Michael Jai White
 Chain of Command: The Road from 9/11 to Abu Ghraib, a 2004 nonfictional book by investigative journalist Seymour Hersh
 Chain of Command (2017 novel), a military science-fiction novel by Frank Chadwick
 Chain of Command (album), a 2004 album by power metal group Jag Panzer
 "Chain of Command" (Star Trek: The Next Generation), a 1992 two-part episode of the TV series Star Trek: The Next Generation
 "Chains of Command", a 1995 episode of the TV series seaQuest 2032
 "Chain of Command" (Beast Wars), a 1996 episode of the animated TV series Beast Wars: Transformers